Major General Timothy David Hyams,  is a senior British Army officer.

Military career
Hyams was commissioned into the 5th Royal Inniskilling Dragoon Guards in 1986. His regiment was amalgamated with the 4th/7th Royal Dragoon Guards to form the Royal Dragoon Guards in 1992. After deployments in Northern Ireland and Kosovo, he became commanding officer of the Royal Dragoon Guards in 2005, in which capacity he was deployed to Iraq in 2007.

Hyams became Director of Personal Services in July 2011 and, after being sent to Afghanistan on a mission to consider the insider threat across the NATO command, he became Director of Personnel Strategy in January 2013 and Commander, Collective Training Group, Land Warfare Centre in February 2014. He went on to be General Officer Commanding Army Recruiting and Training Division in October 2016, Director Land Warfare in April 2018 and became Military Secretary and General Officer, Scotland, in October 2019.

He was Colonel Commandant of the Scottish, Welsh and Irish Division, Infantry until he relinquished this position in December 2022. 

Hyams was appointed Companion of the Order of the Bath (CB) in the 2022 New Year Honours.

References

 

|-

British Army major generals
Companions of the Order of the Bath
Officers of the Order of the British Empire
5th Royal Inniskilling Dragoon Guards officers
Living people
Year of birth missing (living people)
Royal Dragoon Guards officers
British Army personnel of the War in Afghanistan (2001–2021)